Jay Williams (born 4 October 2000) is an English professional footballer who plays as a defensive midfielder.

Club career
Williams joined Northampton Town at the age of 13 and went onto progress through the youth ranks, before making his first-team debut during their EFL Trophy tie against Wycombe Wanderers, featuring for the entire 90 minutes.

He made his league debut in a 5–0 away win to Macclesfield Town coming off of the bench to replace Sam Foley in the 73rd minute. He went on to play a vital part in the rest of that season racking up 14 appearances in total.

In November 2020, Williams signed for National League North club Kettering Town.

On 7 January 2021, Williams signed for League Two side Harrogate Town.

Following on from his release from Harrogate, he dropped down three divisions to sign for Southern Football League Premier Division Central side AFC Rushden & Diamonds. He made the switch to divisional rivals Banbury United in October 2021 and extended his stay in December when he signed a contract until the end of the season.

Career statistics

Notes

References

External links
Profile at Aylesbury United

2000 births
Living people
English footballers
Association football defenders
English Football League players
National League (English football) players
Southern Football League players
Northampton Town F.C. players
Kettering Town F.C. players
Harrogate Town A.F.C. players
AFC Rushden & Diamonds players
Banbury United F.C. players